Karel Scheder (born 13 May 1950) is a Czechoslovak sprint canoeist who competed in the early 1970s. He finished ninth in the C-2 1000 m event at the 1972 Summer Olympics in Munich.

References
Sports-reference.com profile

1950 births
Canoeists at the 1972 Summer Olympics
Czechoslovak male canoeists
Living people
Olympic canoeists of Czechoslovakia